Joel Davison Harden (born c. January 14, 1972) is a Canadian politician, who was elected to the Legislative Assembly of Ontario in the 2018 provincial election. He represents the riding of Ottawa Centre as a member of the Ontario New Democratic Party.

Background 
Harden grew up in Vankleek Hill, Ontario. Prior to being elected, Harden was a researcher at the Canadian Federation of Students. He has also been an instructor at the Department of Law and Legal Studies at Carleton University and teaching assistant  professor at Brock University and has also taught at Nipissing University, McMaster University and the Labour College of Canada. From 2005 to 2010, he was senior researcher at the Canadian Labour Congress and was director of the labour education department at the Canadian Labour Congress from 2010 to 2012. During his time as the Director of Education at the Canadian Labour Congress Harden designed the campaign that won an expansion of the Canada Pension Plan.

Harden earned his undergraduate degree in sociology and political studies at Queen's University and his masters and doctorate in political science at York University. From 1998 to 2000, he was the chairman of the Ontario section of the Canadian Federation of Students.

Politics 
Harden is a self-described democratic socialist and a supporter of the BDS movement.

On August 23, 2018, Harden was appointed Official Opposition Critic for Accessibility & Persons with Disabilities; Pensions; Seniors' Affairs. Harden's parliamentary roles include sitting on the Standing Committee on Social Policy.

In November 2022, Harden was criticized for an interview in which he spoke about hateful language in activism related to Israel and Palestine. Harden ultimately issued a brief written apology for perpetuating anti-Semitic tropes. In the interview, Harden takes a pro-Palestinian position and said: "I think it's important to remain steadfast against all supremacist ideologies, all forms of prejudice and racism. When I'm at Palestinian solidarity demonstrations, if I hear people making antisemitic remarks, I take a point of pulling that person aside and saying "you're not helping."

Electoral record

References

External links

1972 births
21st-century Canadian politicians
Academic staff of Brock University
Canadian democratic socialists
Academic staff of Carleton University
Living people
Academic staff of McMaster University
Academic staff of Nipissing University
Ontario New Democratic Party MPPs
People from the United Counties of Prescott and Russell
Politicians from Ottawa
Queen's University at Kingston alumni
York University alumni